Fosca is an 1869 Italian language novel by Iginio Ugo Tarchetti, initially published in serial form.  Fosca served as the basis for Ettore Scola's 1981 film Passione d'amore as well as Stephen Sondheim's 1994 stage musical Passion.  Due to the success of the stage adaptation, an English translation by Lawrence Venuti was published in 1994 as  Passion: A Novel (Mercury House).

References

1869 novels
Italian novels adapted into films
Novels first published in serial form